Ku Bon-chan ( or  ; born 31 January 1993) is a South Korean recurve archer. He won an individual and a team gold medal at the 2016 Olympics and two team gold medals at the 2015 World Championships.

Career

He made his international debut at the 2014 Archery World Cup after having participated in numerous Asian competitions prior. Ku competed in the individual recurve event, team recurve event, and recurve mixed team event at the 2015 World Archery Championships in Copenhagen, Denmark, where he took home gold medals in the team recurve event and recurve mixed team event.

Ku represented South Korea in the men's team archery event and men's individual archery event at the 2016 Summer Olympics in Rio de Janeiro, Brazil. Ku and the South Korean team won the gold medal in the team event. Ku shot six consecutive perfect tens across three sets in the gold medal match against the United States. South Korea's victory against the United States marked the first time a South Korean archery team had beaten an archery team from the United States at the Olympics. In the men's individual archery event, Ku defeated Frenchman Jean-Charles Valladont in the final to win his second Olympic gold medal.

References

External links

 
 

1993 births
Living people
South Korean male archers
Place of birth missing (living people)
Asian Games medalists in archery
Archers at the 2014 Asian Games
World Archery Championships medalists
Olympic archers of South Korea
Archers at the 2016 Summer Olympics
Medalists at the 2016 Summer Olympics
Olympic gold medalists for South Korea
Olympic medalists in archery
Asian Games bronze medalists for South Korea
Medalists at the 2014 Asian Games
Universiade medalists in archery
Universiade gold medalists for South Korea
Universiade silver medalists for South Korea
South Korean Buddhists
Medalists at the 2015 Summer Universiade
People from Gyeongju
Sportspeople from North Gyeongsang Province
21st-century South Korean people